La Almunia de Doña Godina is a municipality in the province of Zaragoza, Aragon, Spain.

This town is located by the E90 (N II) Highway. It is home to the church of Nuestra Señora de la Asunción, rebuilt from 1754; it has maintained the original Mudéjar square-plan tower (14th century), which has a height of 40 meters. Other sights include the complex of San Juan de Jerusalén, the hermitage of Nuestra Señora de Cabañas and the convent of St. Lawrence.

See also
Valdejalón

References

External links 

 website

Municipalities in the Province of Zaragoza